SHL Schweizerische Hotelfachschule Luzern is a competence centre for applied hospitality management education with national and international recognition. Founded in 1909, SHL is a leading professional-oriented hotel management institution in Lucerne, Switzerland.

SHL is one of the original Swiss hotel management schools and offers one of the two Bachelor of Science in Hospitality Management degrees in Switzerland accredited by the Swiss federal government and in compliance with the Bologna Declaration.

History
The founding organisation of SHL Schweizerische Hotelfachschule Luzern, Union Helvetia – today Hotel & Gastro Union - was founded 1886 with a strong focus on the professional development of hotel employees. With the boom of hotel construction in Switzerland, which was specifically aimed at tourists (between 1890 and 1914), the demand for talented and trained hotel employees also increased. To meet this demand, Union Helvetia opened the SHL Schweizerische Hotelfachschule Luzern in 1909.

Education
SHL offers two main programmes:
 The Bachelor of Science in Hospitality Management (taught in English or German), which is offered in cooperation with the Lucerne University of Applied Sciences and Arts Lucerne University of Applied Sciences and Arts Hochschule Luzern, combines and intermeshes hotel management and business administration.
 Dipl. Hôtelière-Restauratrice / Hotelier-Restaurateur HF, consisting of five practice-oriented semesters, three five-month industry internships and a six-month employment in a management position.

References

External links
www.shl.ch

1909 establishments in Switzerland
Educational institutions established in 1909